The Case of the Rising Stars is the eighty-seventh volume in the Nancy Drew mystery series. It was first published in 1989 under the pseudonym Carolyn Keene.

Plot
Nancy, Bess and George arrive in Chicago for the Mystery Lovers of America convention. The two stars scheduled to appear are kidnapped, and some think it is a ratings ploy, but Nancy uncovers the truth and only she can save them.

References

Nancy Drew books
1989 American novels
1989 children's books
Novels set in Chicago
Simon & Schuster books